Pedro Ruíz (born 6 July 1947) is a Peruvian footballer. He played in two matches for the Peru national football team in 1975. He was also part of Peru's squad for the 1975 Copa América tournament.

References

External links
 

1947 births
Living people
Peruvian footballers
Peru international footballers
Place of birth missing (living people)
Association football midfielders
Sporting Cristal footballers
Juan Aurich footballers
Unión Huaral footballers